"Infinity" is a song by American singer-songwriter Jaymes Young, released as a single on June 23, 2017, from his debut studio album Feel Something. In 2021, the song went viral on TikTok, where it has appeared in 5.2 million videos so far.

Content
"Infinity" was released in 2017, and included in Young's debut album Feel Something. In 2021, it went viral on video sharing app TikTok, and used for fan edits of the Japanese anime series SK8 the Infinity the same year. The song is written in the key of B minor, with a tempo of 122 beats per minute.

Credits and personnel
Credits adapted from AllMusic.

 Billboard – associate producer, composer
 Michelle Mancini – mastering engineer
 Jaymes Young – associate producer, composer, drums, guitar, keyboards, mixing Engineer, primary artist, vocals

Charts

Weekly charts

Monthly charts

Year-end charts

Certifications

Release history

References

2017 songs
2017 singles
Atlantic Records singles
Songs written by Billboard (record producer)
Number-one singles in Romania
Viral videos